Washago station is a passenger railway station in the community of Washago, Ontario, Canada (part of the Township of Severn). The station is located immediately south of Simcoe County Road 169, east of Highway 11.

It is the first station stop after Toronto Union Station for Via Rail's transcontinental Canadian route. Washago was also the first stop northwest of Union Station for the Ontario Northland Railway's Northlander, until that train service was discontinued in 2012.

In 2021 the Government of Ontario announced plans to restore service using ONR from this station north to either Timmins or Cochrane by the mid 2020s.

Services

The station is unstaffed with all ticketing and baggage handling services provided by VIA Rail onboard train staff. Tracks are maintained by Via Rail and CN Rail.

Station buildings

The station building was built by the Canadian Northern Railway in 1906, at a location 200 meters west of its present site and moved in 1922 to replace the Grand Trunk station that had been destroyed about 1913. The GTR station was north of the present station location, behind the Washago Hotel. The relocated Canadian Northern station was turned so its original canopy end was at the south end of the building and the bay window faced to the Grand Trunk side, but an additional bay window was added on the west side. The original station location was on Centennial Park Drive. The Canadian Northern originally crossed the GTR line with a diamond and interlocking tower, which was removed in 1920-21 when Canadian National Railway assumed operations of Grand Trunk Railway.

An abandoned CNR steam locomotive-era water tower at the station has been decorated and is used for the hamlet's water supply. The station itself consists of a transit shelter and platform with a small waiting room (grey structure) located by the tracks. The white station building is now closed to passengers because it is used by CN for maintenance staff and equipment. Parking is limited and rest of the station area is used to store CN Rail maintenance vehicles.

References

External links

Via Rail stations in Ontario
Ontario Northland Railway stations
Railway stations in Simcoe County